The 1948 Wilberforce State Green Wave football team was an American football team that represented Wilberforce State University—now known as Central State University– in the Midwest Athletic Association (MAA) during the 1948 college football season. In its 13th season under head coach Gaston F. Lewis, the team compiled a 9–1–1 record, won the MAA championship, was defeated by Hampton in the Fish Bowl but defeated Prairie View A&M in the Prairie View Bowl, and all outscored opponents by a total of 237 to 61. The team was also recognized as a black college national co-champion.

Schedule

References

Wilberforce State
Central State Marauders football seasons
Black college football national champions
Wilberforce State Green Wave football